"Jolly Old Saint Nicholas" is a Christmas song  that originated with a poem by Emily Huntington Miller (1833–1913), published as "Lilly's Secret" in The Little Corporal Magazine in December 1865. The song's lyrics have also been attributed to Benjamin Hanby, who wrote a similar song in the 1860s, Up on the Housetop. However, the lyrics now in common use closely resemble Miller's 1865 poem. Some people have also attributed the lyrics to John Piersol McCaskeya song editor and publisher, among other things, at the time. His great great grandson has said he wrote the song in 1867, and that the "Johnny" mentioned in the song who wants a pair of skates, is McCaskey's late son, John, who died as a child. However, there is no known evidence for this. McCaskey's own published 1881 book, Franklin Square Song Collection No. 1, a book in which proper attribution is given to songs' lyricists and composers, does not list himself as having had anything to do with the song.

The music is generally believed to have been written by James R. Murray. The first publication of the music was in 1874 in School Chimes, A New School Music Book by S. Brainard's Sons, and attributes the music to him. The 1881 publication by McCaskey gives attribution to the S. Brainard's Sons publication, which would mean Murray.

Some notable recordings were by Ray Smith in 1949, Chet Atkins in 1961, Eddy Arnold in 1962, The Chipmunks in 1963, Andy Williams in 1995, Anne Murray in 2001, and Carole King in 2017.

The Ray Smith 1949 version was revised, rearranged, and had additional lyrics credited to songwriter Vaughn Horton; this version was also used for a single release by the Ames Brothers in 1951 and by Wilf Carter for his 1965 Christmas in Canada album.

Ray Conniff's version of the song, featured on his 1962 album "We Wish You a Merry Christmas", helped propel the album to platinum status, one of two platinum albums in Conniff's career.

Lyrics

This is the original published song in 1881:

Jolly old Saint Nicholas
Lean your ear this way;
Don't you tell a single soul
What I'm going to say,
Christmas Eve is coming soon;
Now you dear old man,
Whisper what you'll bring to me;
Tell me if you can.
When the clock is striking twelve,
When I'm fast asleep,
Down the chimney broad and black
With your pack you'll creep;
All the stockings you will find
Hanging in a row;
Mine will be the shortest one;
You'll be sure to know. 
Johnny wants a pair of skates;
Susy wants a dolly
Nellie wants a story book,
She thinks dolls are folly
As for me, my little brain 
Isn't very bright;
Choose for me, dear Santa Claus,
What you think is right.

In The Chipmunks' version of the song, Alvin, Simon and Theodore's names are mentioned instead. "Alvin wants a pair of skates, Simon wants a sled, Theodore, a picture book, yellow, blue and red."

In the Ray Conniff version as part of a medley with The Little Drummer Boy; Susy wants a sled instead of a doll.  Nellie wants a picture book in yellow, blue and red and her opinion of dolls are omitted (but no different than the original lyrics).  The final lyrics are also changed as a child named Billy is mentioned and that Santa should give him a drum cause "he likes that best."  The song then transitions into Little Drummer Boy which is similar to the Harry Simeone Chorale recording.  Certain radio stations that do all Christmas radio have split the medley into two different song tracks thanks to a brief pause in the middle of the medley.

See also

Santa Claus
Christmas gift-bringers around the world
List of Christmas carols

References

External links
http://www.christmas-carols.net/carols/jolly-saint-nick.html

American Christmas songs
1865 songs
Songs about Santa Claus
Songs based on poems
Songs written by George Vaughn Horton